Saint-Germain-sur-l'Arbresle (literally Saint-Germain on L'Arbresle) is a former commune in the Rhône department in Rhône-Alpes region in eastern France.

On 1 January 2013, Saint-Germain-sur-l'Arbresle and Nuelles merged becoming one commune called Saint-Germain-Nuelles.

See also
Communes of the Rhône department

References

Former communes of Rhône (department)